The Green Hills of Earth is a short story by Robert A. Heinlein.

Green Hills of Earth may also refer to:

 The Green Hills of Earth (short story collection) by Robert A. Heinlein
 Green Hills of Earth (album) by The Mother Hips